Mastigodiaptomus is a genus of Neotropical copepods in the family Diaptomidae. Two of the eight species in the genus are listed as Data Deficient (DD) on the IUCN Red List, and one is listed as a vulnerable species (VU):
Mastigodiaptomus albuquerquensis (Herrick, 1895) – Mexico, United States
Mastigodiaptomus amatitlanensis (M. S. Wilson, 1941) – Guatemala 
Mastigodiaptomus maya Suárez-Morales & Elías-Gutiérrez, 2000 – Campeche
Mastigodiaptomus montezumae (Brehm, 1955) – central Mexico 
Mastigodiaptomus nesus Bowman, 1986 – southeastern Mexico
Mastigodiaptomus purpureus (Marsh, 1907) – Cuba, Haiti 
Mastigodiaptomus reidae Suárez-Morales & Elías-Gutiérrez, 2000 – Campeche
Mastigodiaptomus texensis M. S. Wilson, 1953 – Tamaulipas, Yucatán Peninsula

References

Diaptomidae
Taxonomy articles created by Polbot